The 2014 Trophée des Alpilles was a professional tennis tournament played on hard courts. It was the sixth edition of the tournament which was part of the 2014 ATP Challenger Tour. It took place in Saint-Rémy-de-Provence, France between 1 and 7 September 2014.

Singles main-draw entrants

Seeds

 1 Rankings are as of August 25, 2014.

Other entrants
The following players received wildcards into the singles main draw:
  Maxime Chazal
  Nicolas Mahut 
  Vitalii Shcherba
  Martin Vaïsse

The following players entered into the singles main draw as alternates:
  Richard Becker
  Florent Serra

The following player entered into the singles main draw as a lucky loser:
  Michael Lammer

The following players received entry from the qualifying draw:
  Sergey Betov 
  Bar Tzuf Botzer 
  Erik Crepaldi 
  Filip Veger

Champions

Singles

 Nicolas Mahut def.  Vincent Millot 6–7(3–7), 6–4, 6–3

Doubles

 Pierre-Hugues Herbert /  Konstantin Kravchuk def.  David Guez /  Martin Vaïsse 6–1, 7–6(7–3)

External links
Official website

Trophee des Alpilles
Trophée des Alpilles
Trophee des Alpilles